The Sowers is a surviving 1916 silent film drama produced by Jesse Lasky, released through Paramount Pictures and directed by William C. deMille. The feature stars Blanche Sweet and Thomas Meighan and is based on the 1896 novel The Sowers by Henry Seton Merriman. It is preserved in the Library of Congress collections.

Cast
Blanche Sweet - Karin Dolokhof
Thomas Meighan - Prince Paul Alexis
Mabel Van Buren - Princess Tanya
Ernest Joy - Count Egor Strannik
Theodore Roberts - Boris Dolokhof
Horace B. Carpenter - Chief of Secret Police
Raymond Hatton - The Peddler
Harold Howard - The Tramp

See also
Blanche Sweet filmography

References

External links
The Sowers at IMDb.com
 allmovie/synopsis

1916 films
American silent feature films
Films directed by William C. deMille
Films based on British novels
Paramount Pictures films
1916 drama films
Silent American drama films
American black-and-white films
Films set in Russia
1910s American films
1910s English-language films